The 1944 United States presidential election was the 40th quadrennial presidential election. It was held on Tuesday, November 7, 1944. The election took place during World War II, which ended the following year. Incumbent Democratic President Franklin D. Roosevelt defeated Republican Thomas E. Dewey to win an unprecedented fourth term. It was also the fifth presidential election in which both major party candidates were registered in the same home state, with the others being in 1860, 1904, 1920, 1940, and 2016. 

Roosevelt had become the first president to win a third term with his victory in the 1940 presidential election, with little doubt that he would seek a fourth term. Unlike in 1940, Roosevelt faced little opposition within his own party, and he easily won the presidential nomination of the 1944 Democratic National Convention. Concerned that Roosevelt's ill health would mean the vice president would likely become president, the convention dropped Roosevelt's vice president Henry A. Wallace in favor of Senator Harry S. Truman of Missouri. Governor Dewey of New York emerged as the front-runner for the Republican nomination after his victory in the Wisconsin primary, and he defeated conservative Governor John W. Bricker at the 1944 Republican National Convention.

As World War II was going well for the United States and its Allies, Roosevelt remained popular despite his long tenure. Dewey campaigned against the New Deal and for a smaller government, but was ultimately unsuccessful in convincing the country to change course. The election was closer than Roosevelt's other presidential campaigns, but Roosevelt still won by a comfortable margin in the popular vote and by a wide margin in the Electoral College. Rumors of Roosevelt's ill health, although somewhat dispelled by his vigorous campaigning, proved to be prescient; Roosevelt died less than three months into his fourth term and was succeeded by Truman.

Nominations

Democratic Party nomination

President Roosevelt was the popular, wartime incumbent and faced little formal opposition. Although many Southern Democrats mistrusted Roosevelt's racial policies, he brought enormous war activities to the region and the end of its marginal status was in sight. No major figure opposed Roosevelt publicly, and he was re-nominated easily when the Democratic Convention met in Chicago. Some pro-segregationist delegates tried to unite behind Virginia senator Harry F. Byrd, but he refused to campaign actively against Roosevelt, and did not get enough delegates to seriously threaten the President's chances.

The obvious physical decline in the president's appearance, as well as rumors of secret health problems, led many delegates and party leaders to strongly oppose Vice President Henry A. Wallace for a second term. Opposition to Wallace came especially from Catholic leaders in big cities and moderate Democrats. Wallace, who had been Roosevelt's vice president since January 1941, was regarded by most conservatives as being too left-wing and personally eccentric to be next in line for the presidency. He had performed so poorly as economic coordinator that Roosevelt had to remove him from that post. Numerous moderate party leaders privately sent word to Roosevelt that they would fight Wallace's re-nomination as vice president and proposed instead Senator Harry S. Truman, a moderate from Missouri. Truman was highly visible as the chairman of a Senate wartime committee investigating fraud and inefficiency in the war program. Roosevelt, who personally liked Wallace and knew little about Truman, agreed reluctantly to accept Truman as his running mate to preserve party unity. Even so, many delegates on the left refused to abandon Wallace, and they voted for him on the first ballot. However, enough large Northern, Midwestern, and Southern states supported Truman to give him victory on the second ballot. The fight over the vice-presidential nomination proved to be consequential; the ticket won and Roosevelt died in April 1945, and Truman instead of Wallace became the nation's thirty-third President.

Republican Party

As 1944 began, the frontrunners for the Republican nomination appeared to be Wendell Willkie, the party's 1940 nominee, Senator Robert A. Taft from Ohio, the leader of the party's conservatives, New York Governor Thomas E. Dewey, the leader of the party's moderate eastern establishment, General Douglas MacArthur, then serving as an Allied commander in the Pacific theater of the war, and former Minnesota Governor Harold Stassen, then serving as a U.S. naval officer in the Pacific. Taft surprised many by declining to run for president as he wanted to remain in the Senate; instead, he voiced his support for a fellow Ohio conservative, Governor John W. Bricker.

With Taft out of the race some Republican conservatives favored General MacArthur. However, MacArthur's chances were limited by the fact that he was leading Allied forces against Japan, and thus could not campaign for the nomination. His supporters entered his name in the Wisconsin primary nonetheless. The Wisconsin primary proved to be the key contest, as Dewey won by a surprisingly wide margin. He took fourteen delegates to four for Harold Stassen, while MacArthur won the three remaining delegates. Willkie was shut out in the Wisconsin primary; he did not win a single delegate. His unexpectedly poor showing in Wisconsin forced him to withdraw as a candidate for the nomination. However, at the time of his sudden death in early October 1944, Willkie had endorsed neither Dewey nor Roosevelt. At the 1944 Republican National Convention in Chicago, Dewey easily overcame Bricker and was nominated for president on the first ballot. Dewey, a moderate to liberal Republican, chose the conservative Bricker as his running mate. Dewey originally preferred fellow liberal California Governor Earl Warren, but agreed on Bricker to preserve party unity (Warren would go on to run with Dewey in the 1948 election). Bricker was nominated for vice president by acclamation.

General election

Polling

Fall campaign

The Republicans campaigned against the New Deal, seeking a smaller government and less-regulated economy as the end of the war seemed in sight. Nonetheless, Roosevelt's continuing popularity was the main theme of the campaign. To quiet rumors of his poor health, Roosevelt insisted on making a vigorous campaign swing in October and rode in an open car through city streets.

Numerous campaign songs for F.D.R. were written, possibly in an effort to advertise on radio during radio's Golden Age. These included 1940's "Franklin D. Roosevelt's Back Again" and "Mister Roosevelt, Won't You Please Run Again." In 1944, Broadway actress Mary Crane Hone published piano march "Let's Re-Re-Re-Elect Roosevelt." Its lyrics were:Let's make each one of our blows felt

For the causes of humanity and war.

With world peace just around the corner,

His leadership is necessary still.

So - Let's Re-Re-Re-Elect Roosevelt...
A high point of the campaign occurred when Roosevelt, speaking to a meeting of labor union leaders, gave a speech carried on national radio in which he ridiculed Republican claims that his administration was corrupt and wasteful with tax money. He particularly derided a Republican claim that he had sent a US Navy warship to pick up his Scottish Terrier Fala in Alaska, noting that "Fala was furious" at such rumors. The speech was met with loud laughter and applause from the labor leaders. In response, Governor Dewey gave a blistering partisan speech in Oklahoma City a few days later on national radio, in which he accused Roosevelt of being "indispensable" to corrupt big-city Democratic organizations and American Communists; he also referred to members of Roosevelt's cabinet as a "motley crew". However, American battlefield successes in Europe and the Pacific during the campaign, such as the liberation of Paris in August 1944 and the successful Battle of Leyte Gulf in the Philippines in October 1944, made President Roosevelt unbeatable.

Results
Throughout the campaign, Roosevelt led Dewey in all the polls by varying margins. On election day, the Democratic incumbent scored a fairly comfortable victory over his Republican challenger. Roosevelt took 36 states for 432 electoral votes (266 were needed to win), while Dewey won twelve states and 99 electoral votes. In the popular vote, Roosevelt won 25,612,916 (53.4%) votes to Dewey's 22,017,929 (45.9%). Dewey conceded in a radio address the following morning, but declined  personally calling or sending a telegram to President Roosevelt. Roosevelt sent Dewey a telegram reading, "I thank you for your statement, which I heard over the air a few minutes ago." Roosevelt's victory made him the only person ever to win the presidential popular vote four times, and neither party would win the popular vote four consecutive times until the Democrats did so in all four elections from 2008 to 2020.

The important question had been which leader, Roosevelt or Dewey, should be chosen for the critical days of peacemaking and reconstruction following the war's conclusion. Most American voters concluded that they should retain the governing party, and particularly the president who represented it. They also felt it unsafe to do so in "wartime", in view of ever-increasing domestic disagreements.

Dewey did better against Roosevelt than any of Roosevelt's previous three Republican opponents: Roosevelt's percentage and margin of the total vote were both less than in 1940. Dewey flipped the states of Wyoming, Wisconsin, and Ohio from the previous election, while Roosevelt flipped Michigan. Dewey also gained the personal satisfaction of finishing ahead of Roosevelt in his hometown of Hyde Park, New York, and ahead of Truman in his hometown of Independence, Missouri. Dewey would again become the Republican presidential nominee in 1948, challenging President Truman (who had assumed that office on FDR's death), and would again lose, though by somewhat smaller popular- and electoral-vote margins.

Roosevelt's net vote totals in the twelve largest cities increased from 2,112,000 votes in the 1940 election to 2,230,000 votes. Of the 3,095 counties/independent cities making returns, Roosevelt won the most popular votes in 1,751 (56.58%) while Dewey carried 1,343 (43.39%). The Texas Regular ticket carried one county (0.03%). In New York, only the combined support of the American Labor and Liberal parties (pledged to Roosevelt but otherwise independent of the Democrats to maintain their identities) enabled Roosevelt to win the electoral votes of his home state.

In 1944, the constantly growing Southern protest against Roosevelt's leadership became clearest in Texas, where 135,553 people voted against Roosevelt but not for the Republican ticket. The Texas Regular ticket resulted from a split in the Democratic Party in its two state conventions, May 23 and September 12, 1944. This ticket, which represented the Democratic element opposing the re-election of President Roosevelt, called for the "restoration of states' rights which have been destroyed by the Communist New Deal" and "restoration of the supremacy of the white race". Its electors were uninstructed.

Records

Until 1996, this would be the last time in which an incumbent Democratic president would win re-election after serving a full term in office, and the last time until 2012 in which the incumbent president won re-election with fewer electoral votes and a smaller popular vote margin than had been won in the previous election. This was also the last time until 2012 in which the incumbent Democratic president would receive over 50 percent of the popular vote twice after receiving 50 percent of it in the previous election.

As of 2022, this was the most recent presidential election in which a Democratic ticket has won every state of the former Confederacy as well as the entire southern region. This is the first election since 1892 that a Democrat won without Wyoming or Ohio. Roosevelt is the only president to serve for more than two terms; in 1951, the Twenty-second Amendment was ratified, limiting the number of terms a person may be president. 

As he had in 1940, Roosevelt was the third of just four presidents in United States history to win re-election with a lower percentage of the electoral vote than in their prior elections, the other three were James Madison in 1812, Woodrow Wilson in 1916 and Barack Obama in 2012. Additionally, Roosevelt was the fourth of only five presidents to win re-election with a smaller percentage of the popular vote than in prior elections, the other four are James Madison in 1812, Andrew Jackson in 1832, Grover Cleveland in 1892, and Obama in 2012.

This is the last election in which New Hampshire and Oregon voted Democratic until 1964 and the last in which Connecticut, Delaware, Maryland, Michigan, New Jersey, New York, and Pennsylvania did so until 1960.

The 432 electoral votes received by Roosevelt, added to the 449 electoral votes he received in 1940, and the 523 electoral votes he received in 1936, and the 472 electoral votes he received in 1932, gave him the most total electoral votes received by any candidate who was elected to the office of president since he is the only president to serve more than two terms (1,876).

Source (Popular Vote): Source (Electoral Vote):

Geography of results

Gallery of maps

Results by state

Close states
Margin of victory less than 1% (25 electoral votes):
 Ohio, 0.37% (11,530 votes)

Margin of victory less than 5% (165 electoral votes):
 Michigan, 1.02% (22,476 votes)
 New Jersey, 1.35% (26,539 votes)
 Wisconsin, 1.80% (24,119 votes)
 Wyoming, 2.47% (2,502 votes)
 Pennsylvania, 2.78% (105,425 votes)
 Missouri, 2.94% (46,280 votes)
 Illinois, 3.47% (140,165 votes)
 Idaho, 3.49% (7,262 votes)
 Maryland, 3.70% (22,541 votes)
 New Hampshire, 4.24% (9,747 votes)
 Iowa, 4.50% (47,391 votes) 
 Oregon, 4.85% (23,270 votes)
 Maine, 4.99% (14,803 votes)

Margin of victory between 5% and 10% (138 electoral votes):
 New York, 5.01% (316,591 votes) (tipping point state)
 Connecticut, 5.36% (44,619 votes)
 Minnesota, 5.55% (62,448 votes)
 Indiana, 5.65% (94,488 votes)
 Massachusetts, 5.81% (113,946 votes)
 Colorado, 6.81% (34,400 votes)
 New Mexico, 7.03% (10,701 votes)
 North Dakota, 8.35% (18,391 votes)
 Delaware, 9.11% (11,419 votes)
 Kentucky, 9.23% (80,141 votes)
 Nevada, 9.24% (5,012 votes)
 Montana, 9.35% (19,393 votes)
 West Virginia, 9.78% (69,958 votes)

Statistics

Counties with Highest Percent of Vote (Democratic)
 Armstrong County, South Dakota 100.00%
 Leake County, Mississippi 99.15%
 Chesterfield County, South Carolina 98.77%
 Taliaferro County, Georgia 98.48%
 Barnwell County, South Carolina 98.41%

Counties with Highest Percent of Vote (Republican)
 McIntosh County, North Dakota 91.98%
 Jackson County, Kentucky 91.56%
 Sevier County, Tennessee 87.24%
 Logan County, North Dakota 86.47%
 Owsley County, Kentucky 86.11%

See also
 President of the United States
 1944 United States House of Representatives elections
 1944 United States Senate elections
 United States home front during World War II
 Hell-Bent for Election, an animated Roosevelt campaign film.
 Fourth inauguration of Franklin D. Roosevelt

Notes

References

Further reading
  Anderson, Michael James. "The presidential election of 1944" (PhD thesis University of Cincinnati ProQuest Dissertations Publishing, 1990. 9108602).
 Briggs, Philip J. "General MacArthur and the Presidential Election of 1944." Presidential Studies Quarterly (1992): 31-46. online

 Davis, Michael. Politics as Usual: Thomas Dewey, Franklin Roosevelt, and the Wartime Presidential Campaign of 1944 (Cornell UP, 2014).
 Divine, Robert A. Foreign policy and U.S. presidential elections, 1940-1948 (1974) online free to borrow pp  91 to 166 on 1944.
 Evans, Hugh E. The Hidden Campaign: FDR's Health and the 1944 Election (ME Sharpe, 2002).

 Friedman, Leon. "The Election of 1944" in Arthur M. Schlesinger, ed. History of American Presidential Elections, 1789–1968 (1971)
 Hamby, Alonzo L. Man of the People: A Life of Harry S. Truman (1995), chapter 17.
 Heaster, Brenda L. "Who's on Second: The 1944 Democratic Vice Presidential Nomination." Missouri Historical Review 80.2 (1986): 156-175.
 Jeffries, John W. Testing the Roosevelt coalition: Connecticut society and politics, 1940-1946 (Yale University, 1973).

 Kennedy, Patrick D. "Chicago's Irish Americans and the Candidacies of Franklin D. Roosevelt, 1932-1944." Illinois Historical Journal 88.4 (1995): 263-278 online.
 Luconi, Stefano. "The Impact of World War II on the Political Behavior of the Italian-American Electorate in New York City." New York History (2002): 404-417 online.
 Norpoth, Helmut. Unsurpassed: The Popular Appeal of Franklin Roosevelt (Oxford University Press, 2018).
 Overacker, Louise. "Presidential Campaign Funds, 19441." American Political Science Review 39.5 (1945): 899-925.
 Johnstone, Andrew , and Andrew Priest, eds.  US Presidential Elections and Foreign Policy: Candidates, Campaigns, and Global Politics from FDR to Bill Clinton (2017) pp  40-60.online

 Rovin, Fern Rochelle. "Politics and the Presidential Election of 1944" (PhD dissertation Indiana University 1973) (ProQuest Dissertations Publishing, 1973, 7414183).
 Savage, Sean J. "The 1936-1944 Campaigns," in William D. Pederson, ed. A Companion to Franklin D. Roosevelt (2011) pp 96–113 

 Smith, Richard Norton. Thomas E. Dewey and His Times (1984), a standard scholarly biography

Primary sources 
 Cantril, Hadley and Mildred Strunk, eds.; Public Opinion, 1935–1946 (1951), massive compilation of many public opinion polls from USA online
 Gallup, George H. ed. The Gallup Poll, Volume One 1935–1948 (1972) statistical reports on each poll
 Chester, Edward W  A guide to political platforms (1977) online
 Porter, Kirk H. and Donald Bruce Johnson, eds. National party platforms, 1840-1964 (1965) online 1840-1956

External links
 Tuesday In November: The 1944 Presidential Election
 1944 popular vote by counties

 Election of 1944 in Counting the Votes

 
United States home front during World War II
Presidency of Franklin D. Roosevelt
Franklin D. Roosevelt
Harry S. Truman
November 1944 events